Perfect Timing is the debut album recorded by the McAuley Schenker Group. It was the first collaboration between Michael Schenker and Robin McAuley (ex-Grand Prix and Far Corporation), resulting in Schenker's first top 100 US hit with the song "Gimme Your Love."

At this point, the band featured an eclectic mix of musicians in terms of nationalities. McAuley hails from Ireland originally, while Schenker and drummer Bodo Schopf are both from Germany. American guitarist Mitch Perry (aka Mitch Brownstein from the band The Kydz) had originally played in bass virtuoso Billy Sheehan's band, Talas (and had later joined the revamped Australian/American version of the band Heaven), while bassist Rocky Newton and guest keyboardist/rhythm guitarist Steve Mann were British and had previously been members of the band Lionheart. Mann would officially join the band for MSG's next album, replacing Perry.

Track listing
All songs written by Robin McAuley and Michael Schenker, except where noted.
"Gimme Your Love" (Rocky Newton, McAuley) – 4:52
"Here Today - Gone Tomorrow" – 4:38
"Don't Stop Me Now" – 3:56
"No Time for Losers" – 4:13
"Follow the Night" – 4:39
"Get Out" – 4:07
"Love Is Not a Game" (Newton, McAuley, Alan Nelson) – 4:12
"Time" (Schenker, McAuley, Newton) – 4:00
"I Don't Wanna Lose" 4:15
"Rock 'Til You're Crazy" 4:05

2000 Japanese remaster bonus tracks
"Gimme Your Love" (Edit) (Newton, McAuley) – 4:25
"Follow the Night" (Edit) (Schenker, McAuley) – 4:21

Personnel
Band members
Robin McAuley – lead vocals
Michael Schenker – lead guitar
Mitch Perry – rhythm guitar,  additional lead guitar on tracks 1 and 6, backing vocals
Rocky Newton – bass guitar, backing vocals
Bodo Schopf – drums

Additional musicians
Steve Mann – keyboards and rhythm guitars

Production
Andy Johns – producer, engineer, mixing
Henrik Nilsson, Frank Wuttke, Jan Nemec, John Hanlon, Mark Stebbeds – engineers
Paul Wertheimer – mixing
Stephen Marcussen – mastering

Charts
Album - Billboard (United States)

Singles - Billboard (United States)

Singles - UK Singles Chart

References

Further reading 
 

1987 debut albums
McAuley Schenker Group albums
Albums produced by Andy Johns
Capitol Records albums
Albums recorded at Sound City Studios